This is a list of diseases of foliage plants belonging to the family Asclepiadaceae.

Plant Species

Fungal diseases

References
Common Names of Diseases, The American Phytopathological Society

Foliage plant (Asclepiadaceae)